Olaya Pérez Pazo (born June 7, 1983) is a Venezuelan beach volleyball player. She competed alongside Norisbeth Agudo in the women's beach volleyball tournament at the 2016 Summer Olympics.

References

1983 births
Living people
Venezuelan beach volleyball players
Women's beach volleyball players
Olympic beach volleyball players of Venezuela
Beach volleyball players at the 2016 Summer Olympics